Catrine, Sorn and Mauchline East was one of 32 electoral wards of East Ayrshire Council. The ward was created in 1999 and elected one councillor using the first-past-the-post voting electoral system.

The ward was a Labour stronghold as the party successfully held the seat at every election. George Smith was the only councillor elected as he represented the ward from 1999 to 2007.

In 2007, the ward was abolished and replaced by the multi-member Ballochmyle ward as council elections moved to a proportional voting system – the single transferable vote – following the implementation of the Local Governance (Scotland) Act 2004.

Boundaries
The Catrine, Sorn and Mauchline East ward was created in 1999 by the Third Statutory Reviews of Electoral Arrangements which combined part of the former Catrine, Sorn and North Auchinleck ward with part of the Mauchline ward. The ward centered on the villages of Catrine and Sorn as well as the eastern part of Mauchline and took in an area in the east of East Ayrshire next to its border with South Lanarkshire. In 2007, the ward was abolished as the Local Governance (Scotland) Act 2004 saw proportional representation and new multi-member wards introduced. The vast majority of the area covered by the Catrine, Sorn and Mauchline East ward was placed into the new Ballochmyle ward and a small area south of the A76 was placed in the Cumnock and New Cumnock ward.

Councillors

Election results

2003 election

1999 election

References

Wards of East Ayrshire
Mauchline